Chitrakoot  is a neighbourhood in West Jaipur. Chitrakoot is divided into 12 sectors, out of which 10 are residential and 2 are for commercial and social purposes.

Major Places

Education 
Jayshree Periwal High School
Bhabha Public School
Blue Star Public School
Chitrakoot Academy 

Worship 
Shree Swaminarayan Mandir

Health 
Shalby Hospital
Global Heart General Hospital

Sports
Shree Pratap Yadav Stadium
Spac3

Location

Chitakoot is situated on Ajmer Road.
Chitrakoot is bordered by Vaishali Nagar on the North, Vidyut Nagar to the East and Pratap Nagar to the West. It is 15 km from Sanganer Airport. 200 feet Bypass is adjoining it.

Villages in Jaipur district